John Robert Krampf (born 1956) is an American former science educator and convicted sex offender. He studied geology at the University of Tennessee and worked at the Pink Palace Museum and Planetarium until 1987, when he began touring the United States with a one-man show he called "Mr. Electricity".

In 2006, Krampf adopted the moniker "The Happy Scientist" and began to post educational entertainment content targeted towards children online, with videos depicting various science projects and experiments.

In September 2020, Krampf was arrested for possession of child pornography. He pled guilty in March 2021, and was sentenced to 4 years in prison.

References

External links
 Krampf's official website

1956 births
Living people
People from Memphis, Tennessee
University of Tennessee alumni